The men's javelin throw at the 2022 Commonwealth Games as part of the athletics programme, took place at the Alexander Stadium on the 7th of August 2022

Pakistan's Arshad Nadeem won the gold medal throwing 90.18m setting a new games record.

Records
Prior to this competition, the existing world and Games records were as follows:

Schedule
The schedule was as follows:

All times are British Summer Time (UTC+1)

Results

Final
The medals were determined in the final.

References

Men's javelin throw
2022